iSight is a brand name used by Apple Inc. to refer to cameras on various devices. The name was originally used for the external iSight webcam, which retailed for US$149, connected to a computer via a FireWire cable, and came with a set of mounts to place it atop any then current Apple display, laptop computer, all-in-one desktop computer, or flat surface.

Apple introduced iSight at the 2003 Worldwide Developers Conference, and It was intended to be used with iChat AV, Apple's video-conferencing client. iMovie (version 4 and later) could also be used to capture video from the device. In April 2005, Apple released a firmware update for the iSight to improve audio performance. As of October 13, 2008, the external iSight was no longer for sale in the Apple online store or in retail locations.

Meanwhile, Apple began using the term to refer to the camera built into Apple's iMac, MacBook, MacBook Air, and MacBook Pro computers, Thunderbolt Display, and Cinema Display. In November 2010, Apple began calling them "FaceTime cameras". However, the term was not retired, as the iPhone 4 and later, iPod Touch (fifth generation and later), iPad (third generation and later), iPad Mini, and iPad Pro all incorporate an “iSight” rear camera in addition to a front-facing “FaceTime” or “FaceTime HD” camera.

Design

The external iSight's ¼-inch color CCD sensor has 640×480-pixel VGA resolution, with a custom-designed three-part F/2.8 lens with two aspherical elements. It features autoexposure, autofocusing from 50 mm to infinity, and video capture at 30 frames per second in 24-bit color with a variety of shutter speeds. However, the iSight has an image delay of approximately 120 ms.

The iSight incorporates internal microphones with dual-element noise suppression. The actual camera only takes up one-quarter of the unit; the remaining space is primarily occupied by its two microphones and mounting socket.

The iSight camera weighs 2.3 ounces (63.8 grams). It uses a single FireWire 400 (IEEE 1394a) cable (included) for audio, video, and power.

Four camera mounts, a plastic tube carrying case, and a FireWire camera mount adapter are also included. The user can select the mounting bracket most appropriate for their monitor or other mounting surface. It is fully compatible with its native macOS, as well as partially compatible with the Microsoft Windows and Linux operating systems.

The iSight has a small green LED that illuminates when the camera is in use. It also has an iris that closes by twisting the front of the camera.

Built-in iSight

Although external and internal iSights have significant differences, Apple has used the "iSight" name to brand its built-in video camera found in their MacBook (includes Retina MacBook (2015-2019)), MacBook Air and MacBook Pro notebook computers, iMac desktop computers produced since late 2005 and the LED Cinema Display. While the external iSight is similar to the built-in iSight, the built-in iSight uses an internal USB 2.0 interface and not the FireWire 400 (IEEE 1394a) interface used by the external iSight camera. Further, the built-in iSight has a plastic lens, is fixed-focus, and uses a CMOS active pixel sensor, rather than the CCD used in the external iSight. With the LED-Backlit MacBook Pros, Apple has moved to using a sensor capable of 1280x1024 pixels. The built-in iSight can also be used in the Photo Booth application on macOS and iOS. 

In 2011, the iSight branding on cameras built-in to displays on the MacBook Pro and iMac was renamed to FaceTime camera. The FaceTime HD cameras included with the 2011 and later models of the MacBook Pro and iMac can output 720p high-definition video. The iMac Pro, released in December 2017, introduced a newer generation FaceTime HD camera which now outputs 1080p video. This newer generation camera was later built into the 2020 27-inch iMac model in August 2020.

Security concerns

Some MacBooks are affected by the iSeeYou vulnerability, potentially allowing their iSight cameras to record the user without the user's knowledge.

iSight on Linux
Linux kernel 3.0+ internally contains the driver for the iSight camera.

For previous versions of the kernel, one has to manually take out the firmware from Apple's driver through a specific program. This is because the Apple driver cannot be deployed inside a Linux distribution, the cause being legal issues. This lack of native support in the kernel for iSight persists on MacBook 2.1.

iSight Camera vs. FaceTime Camera
The June 2010 release of the iPhone 4, where Apple introduced the FaceTime communication platform, also involved them naming the integrated front-facing camera on the device a "FaceTime Camera". All subsequent devices and models, including smartphones and personal computers, released after this announcement had the camera branded as FaceTime cameras.

In March 2012, with the release of the third generation iPad, Apple re-introduced the iSight camera branding for the rear camera on iPhone and iPod Touch releases (retroactively, in the cases of older models still being sold at the time). Apple would once again discontinue use of the iSight branding in 2015, starting with the release of the iPhone 6s. Similarly, Apple discontinued the use of the FaceTime camera branding with the iPhone 8 as the last phone in 2017 in favour for the TrueDepth Camera branding on the iPhone X.

In general usage the iSight rear camera is used to take higher-resolution photos in scenarios where better quality is usually desired, whereas the front-facing camera is used for lower-resolution casual video conversations using the FaceTime communication platform.

References

External links

iSight Linux audio driver project page
iSight Linux driver project on SourceForge
iSight Programming Guide for FireWire iSight cameras on Apple.com

Apple Inc. peripherals
Webcams
Teleconferencing
Videotelephony